William Binney may refer to:
William Binney (intelligence official) (born 1943), American intelligence official and NSA whistleblower
William G. Binney (1833–1909), American malacologist

See also
Edward William Binney (1812–1881), English geologist